Kondinskoye Airport  is a minor airport in Russia.

References

Airports built in the Soviet Union
Airports in Khanty-Mansi Autonomous Okrug